Senator Calderon may refer to:

Charles Calderon (born 1950), California State Senate
Ron Calderon (born 1957), California State Senate
Sila María González Calderón (born 1965), Senate of Puerto Rico